Minuscule 476 (in the Gregory-Aland numbering), ε 1126 (in the Soden numbering), is a Greek minuscule manuscript of the New Testament, on parchment. Palaeographically it has been assigned to the 11th century. The manuscript was adapted for liturgical use. It has liturgical books and full marginalia. Scrivener labelled it by number 566. The codex is in the British Library as Arundel MS 524.

Description
The codex contains the text of the four Gospels on 218 parchment leaves (size ), with only one lacunae (John 11:18-41). The text is written in one column per page, 27 lines per page.

There is also a division according to the Ammonian Sections (in Mark 236 sections, the last section in 16:15), with references to the Eusebian Canons.

Text
The Greek text of the codex is a representative of the Byzantine text-type. Aland placed it in Category V.
It belongs to the textual family K1.

History

Scrivener and Gregory dated it to the 11th century. It is dated by the INTF to the 11th century.

The manuscript was brought from the East to England by Thomas Earl of Arundel in 1646. Henry Howard, Evelyn's Duke of Norfolk, presented it to the Royal Society in 1667 (along with ℓ 183 and ℓ 187). It was transferred in 1831 to the British Museum.

The manuscript was examined and collated by Scrivener, who published its text in 1852. The manuscript was added to the list of New Testament manuscripts by Scrivener (566) and Gregory (476).

It is currently housed at the British Library (Arundel MS 524) in London.

See also

 List of New Testament minuscules
 Biblical manuscript
 Textual criticism

References

Further reading
  (as h)

External links
 Minuscule 476 (GA) at the Encyclopedia of Textual Criticism
 Minuscule 476 (GA) at the British Library

Greek New Testament minuscules
11th-century biblical manuscripts
British Library Arundel collection